Kolsdalen is a neighbourhood in the city of Kristiansand in Agder county, Norway. It is located in the borough of Grim and in the district of Tinnheia. It lies along the European route E39 highway, south of Kolsberg and east of Hannevika.

References

Geography of Kristiansand
Neighbourhoods of Kristiansand